Pavlíkov is a market town in Rakovník District in the Central Bohemian Region of the Czech Republic. It has about 1,000 inhabitants.

Administrative parts
Villages of Chlum, Ryšín, Skřivaň and Tytry are administrative parts of Pavlíkov.

Geography
It lies mostly in the Plasy Uplands, only the northern part of the municipal territory extends into the Křivoklát Highlands. The Rakovnický Stream flows through the territory. The northern and southern part of the territory lie in the Křivoklátsko Protected Landscape Area.

History
The first written mention of Pavlíkov is from 1422. The settlement was founded around 1341.

Sights
The landmark of Pavlíkov is the Church of Saint Catherine. It was built in the late Baroque style in 1776–1785. It replaced an old church from the 14th century.

The Church of Saint Stephan is located in Skřivaň. It is a late Renaissance building, modified into its current appearance in the first half of the 19th century.

Next to the church is a small rural Renaissance castle, which was founded in the second half of the 16th century. Neoclassicat modifications took place in the first half of the 19th century,then it was insensitively modernized in the 20th century.

On Senecká hora above the market town is an observation tower. It was built in 2014–2015.

Notable people
Jiří Čadek (1935–2021), footballer
Jiří Anderle (born 1936), painter and graphic artist

References

External links

Market towns in the Czech Republic
Populated places in Rakovník District